Relentless Records is a British boutique and independent record label currently headed by co-founder Shabs Jobanputra. Originally known for UK garage singles such as Artful Dodger's "Re-Rewind" and B-15 Project's "Girls Like Us", Relentless has also published albums by Joss Stone, KT Tunstall, Union of Knives and Cage the Elephant.

Ownership 
Relentless Records was formally registered as a company on 1 December 1999. After first working with Virgin Records in 2003, the label was sold to it in 2009 (when Virgin was at that time a label of EMI Records).

Affected by the November 2011 dissolution of EMI Group (the parent company of Virgin Records), Virgin's recorded music business was sold to Universal Music UK, a division of Universal Music Group. Propitiously, Jobanputra had departed EMI in April 2011, with a deal returning control of the Relentless name to him whilst leaving the label's roster signed to the major. In this interim period, Relentless released music from Ms. Dynamite and Cage the Elephant and signed artists Rude Kid and Misty Miller.

In January 2012, Relentless became part of Sony Music in the UK, reuniting Jobanputra with his former EMI/Virgin colleague Nick Gatfield.

Recent signings include Bondax, Misha B, Misty Miller, The Other Tribe, Mausi, Roll Deep, Martin Solveig, Chris Malinchak and Rude Kid.

Relentless works closely with in-house company Media Village for its PR and A&R.

Artists currently signed to Relentless Records 
Notable artists signed under Relentless include:
 Alan Walker
 Bad Boy Chiller Crew
 Bryson Tiller 
 Headie One
 Maluma
 Nicky Jam
 OhHeyMy
 Professor Green
 Sody 
 Steve Aoki
 Tom Walker
 Bimini Bon-Boulash

Artists formerly signed to Relentless Records 
Notable artists formerly signed under Relentless include:

 3 of a Kind
 Artful Dodger
 B-15 Project
 Bondax
 Cage the Elephant
 Chris Malinchak
 Daniel Bedingfield
 DJ Pied Piper and the Masters of Ceremonies
 Jay Sean
 Joey Badass
 Joss Stone
 Justin Nozuka
 Kristine Blond
 KT Tunstall
 Lethal Bizzle
 Mark Ryder
 Martin Solveig
 Misha B
 Ms Dynamite
 Nadia Rose
 Not3s
 Only Boys Aloud
 Roll Deep
 Seth Lakeman
 So Solid Crew
 Union of Knives
 Wiley

See also
 List of independent UK record labels

References

External links
 
 Relentless Records on SoundCloud
 Interview with Shabs Jobanputra, HitQuarters November 2005

Record labels established in 1999
British record labels
British independent record labels
Virgin Records
Sony Music
Universal Music Group
Electronic music record labels
Rock record labels
Pop record labels
UK garage record labels
1999 establishments in the United Kingdom